Mohanad Ahmed Dheyaa Al-Azzawi (born 21 September 1996) is an Iraqi swimmer. At the 2012 Summer Olympics, he competed in the Men's 100 metre butterfly, finishing in 41st place overall in the heats, failing to qualify for the semifinals, currently is a retired professional swimmer works as a trainer and as a lead manger in AL-Ibtesam restaurant in Iraq Baghdad.

References

Iraqi male swimmers
Living people
Olympic swimmers of Iraq
Swimmers at the 2012 Summer Olympics
Male butterfly swimmers
Sportspeople from Baghdad
1996 births
20th-century Iraqi people
21st-century Iraqi people